Dolenja Vas pri Mirni Peči is a small village in the Municipality of Mirna Peč in southeastern Slovenia. The area is part of the historical region of Lower Carniola and is now included in the Southeast Slovenia Statistical Region.

Name
The name of the settlement was changed from Dolenja vas to Dolenja vas pri Mirni Peči in 1953.

Notable people
Notable people that were born or lived in Dolenja Vas pri Mirni Peči include:
Alojzij Progar (1857–1918), sculptor

References

External links
Dolenja Vas pri Mirni Peči on Geopedia

Populated places in the Municipality of Mirna Peč